I Travel Because I Have to, I Come Back Because I Love You is a 2009 Brazilian drama film, directed by Marcelo Gomes and Karim Aïnouz.

Plot
José Renato (Irandhir Santos), a geologist, is sent on a 30-day assignment into an isolated region in the Northeast of Brazil. The film is a road movie with a succession of images of the passing landscape and seemingly endless highway, narrated by the protagonist.

References

External links
 

2009 films
2000s Portuguese-language films
Brazilian drama films
2000s drama road movies
Films directed by Marcelo Gomes
Films directed by Karim Aïnouz
2009 drama films